The Thoré is a  river in the Hérault and Tarn departments in southern France. Its source is in the northern part of Rieussec. It flows generally northwest. It is a left tributary of the Agout, into which it flows between Navès and Castres.

Departments and communes along its course
This list is ordered from source to mouth: 
 Hérault: Rieussec, Verreries-de-Moussans, 
 Tarn: Labastide-Rouairoux, Anglès, Lacabarède, Rouairoux, Sauveterre, Albine, Saint-Amans-Valtoret, Saint-Amans-Soult, Bout-du-Pont-de-Larn, Mazamet, Pont-de-Larn, Aussillon, Payrin-Augmontel, Aiguefonde, Caucalières, Labruguière, Castres, Navès,

References

Rivers of France
Rivers of Occitania (administrative region)
Rivers of Hérault
Rivers of Tarn (department)